Martin Riz (born September 16, 1980) is an Italian ski mountaineer.

Selected results 
 2004:
 2nd, World Championship relay race (together with Carlo Battel, Graziano Boscacci and Guido Giacomelli)
 8th, World Championship vertical race
 2007:
 2nd, Scialpinistica del Monte Canin (together with Mirco Mezzanotte)
 4th, Trofeo Mezzalama (together with Tony Sbalbi and Alain Seletto)
 7th, Pierra Menta (together with Jean Pellissier)
 2008:
 1st, World Championship relay race (together with Dennis Brunod, Manfred Reichegger and Denis Trento)
 1st, Ski Alp Val Rendena
 2009:
 3rd, Sci Alpinistica dell'Adamello

External links 
 Martin Riz at Skimountaineering.org

References 

1980 births
Living people
Italian male ski mountaineers
World ski mountaineering champions